Prince Adalbert of Bavaria (3 June 1886 – 29 December 1970) was a member of the Bavarian Royal House of Wittelsbach, historian, author and a German Ambassador to Spain.

Early life
Adalbert was born at the Nymphenburg Palace in Munich, Bavaria. He was the second son of Prince Ludwig Ferdinand of Bavaria and his wife Infanta María de la Paz of Spain.

As most of his peers, following the Abitur, Adalbert joined the Bavarian Army and remained an officer throughout the First World War.  He served with the artillery as a battery commander and later as a General Staff Corps and a cavalry  officer on both the Western and the Eastern Fronts.

1920s-1940s
After Germany's defeat in 1918, Prince Adalbert left the military and began study history at the Ludwig Maximilian University in Munich; later publishing several works on Bavarian and royal history. With the outbreak of World War II, Adalbert was recalled back to the military and served as a staff officer under close family friend Wilhelm Ritter von Leeb. With the Army Group C, he took part in the German invasion of France, but his return to the German Army was short-lived. In early 1941, Prince Adalbert was relieved from all combat duties as a result of the so-called Prinzenerlass. By this decree, Hitler ordered that all members of the former German reigning royal houses were forbidden from joining or participating in any military operations in the Wehrmacht. Later, in May 1941, Prince Adalbert was cashiered from the military and withdrew to the family castle Hohenschwangau in southern Bavaria, where he lived for the rest of the war.

Post World War II
After the war he worked shortly for the Bavarian Red Cross office and in 1952 was appointed by Konrad Adenauer as the Ambassador of the Federal Republic of Germany to Spain. He remained in this post until 1956.

Marriage
On  12 June 1919 Prince Adalbert married Countess Augusta von Seefried auf Buttenheim (1899-1978), the daughter of Count Otto von Seefried auf Buttenheim and Princess Elisabeth Marie of Bavaria. The wedding took place in Salzburg, Austria. The couple had two sons:

 Prince Konstantin of Bavaria (1920–1969)
 Prince Alexander of Bavaria (12 Jun 1923 - 6 May 2001, born and died in Munich, Germany)

Death
Prince Adalbert of Bavaria died on 29 December 1970 at Munich and is buried at the Andechs Abbey cemetery in Bavaria.

Ancestry

Published works
 Das Ende der Habsburger in Spanien (2 Bände). Bruckmann Verlag, München 1929
 Vier Revolutionen und einiges dazwischen. Siebzig Jahre aus dem Leben der Prinzessin Ludwig Ferdinand von Bayern, Infantin von Spanien. Hans Eder Verlag, München, 1932
 An Europas Fürstenhöfen. Lebenserinnerung der Infantin Eulalia von Spanien 1864-1931. Verlag Robert Lutz Nachfolger Otto Schramm, Stuttgart, 1936
 Eugen Beauharnais. Der Stiefsohn Napoleons. Ein Lebensbild. Propyläen Verlag, Berlin, 1940
 Nymphenburg und seine Bewohner. Oldenbourg Verlag, München, 1949
 Max I. Joseph von Bayern. Pfalzgraf, Kurfürst und König. Bruckmann Verlag, München, 1957
 Die Herzen der Leuchtenberg. Chronik einer napoleonisch-bayerisch-europäischen Familie. Prestel Verlag, München, 1963
 Der Herzog und die Tänzerin. Die merkwürdige Geschichte Christians IV. von Pfalz-Zweibrücken und seiner Familie. Pfälzische Verlagsanstalt, Neustadt/Weinstraße, 1966
 Als die Residenz noch Residenz war. Prestel Verlag, München, 1967
 Die Wittelsbacher. Geschichte unserer Familie. Prestel Verlag, München, 1979
 Erinnerungen 1900-1956. Langen-Müller Verlag, München, 1991

References

 Das Bayernbuch vom Kriege 1914-1918. Konrad Krafft von Dellmensingen, Friedrichfranz Feeser, Chr. Belser AG, Verlagsbuchhandlung, Stuttgart 1930
 Die Wittelsbacher. Geschichte unserer Familie. Adalbert, Prinz von Bayern. Prestel Verlag, München, 1979

1886 births
1970 deaths
Ambassadors of Germany to Spain
German Roman Catholics
German Army personnel of World War I
German Army officers of World War II
House of Wittelsbach
Knights of the Golden Fleece of Spain
Knights of Santiago
Crosses of Military Merit
Ludwig Maximilian University of Munich alumni
Members of the Bavarian Reichsrat
Military personnel of Bavaria
People from the Kingdom of Bavaria
Princes of Bavaria
Burials at Andechs Abbey